Harris House may refer to:

Australia 

 Harris House, Toowoomba, listed on the Queensland Heritage Register

United States

Arkansas 
 Harris House (Hensley, Arkansas), listed on the National Register of Historic Places (NRHP) in Pulaski County
 Harris House (Little Rock, Arkansas), NRHP-listed

Colorado 
W.C. Harris House, Sterling, Colorado, listed on the NRHP in Logan County, Colorado

Connecticut 
Smith-Harris House (East Lyme, Connecticut), also known and NRHP-listed as Thomas Avery House
Jonathan Newton Harris House, New London, Connecticut, NRHP-listed

Florida 
Comstock-Harris House, Winter Park, Florida, NRHP-listed

Georgia 
Joel Chandler Harris House, Atlanta, Georgia, NRHP-listed
Harris-Pearson-Walker House, Augusta, Georgia, listed on the NRHP in Richmond County, Georgia
William Harris Homestead, Campton, Walton County, Georgia, also known and NRHP-listed as William Harris Family Farmstead
Harris-Murrow-Trowell House, Oliver, Georgia, listed on the NRHP in Screven County, Georgia
Corra White Harris House, Study, and Chapel, Rydal, Georgia, NRHP-listed
Smith-Harris House (Vesta, Georgia), listed on the NRHP in Oglethorpe County, Georgia

Indiana 
West-Harris House, Fishers, Indiana, listed on the NRHP in Hamilton County, Indiana
Bright B. Harris House, Greensburg, Indiana, listed on the NRHP in Decatur County, Indiana

Iowa 
Dr. Percy and Lileah Harris House, Cedar Rapids, Iowa, listed on the NRHP in Linn County, Iowa

Kansas 
Harris-Borman House, Emporia, Kansas, listed on the NRHP in Lyon County, Kansas
 Harris House (Garnett, Kansas), a Kansas museum
Senator William A. Harris House, Linwood, Kansas, listed on the NRHP in Leavenworth County, Kansas

Kentucky 
A.T. Harris House, Versailles, Kentucky, listed on the NRHP in Woodford County, Kentucky

Maine 
Nathan Harris House, Westbrook, Maine, NRHP-listed

Maryland 
Nathan and Susannah Harris House, Harrisville, Maryland, NRHP-listed

Massachusetts 
John Harris House and Farm, Boston and Brookline, Massachusetts, NRHP-listed
Harris-Merrick House, Worcester, Massachusetts, NRHP-listed
Joseph Harris House, Stambaugh, Michigan, NRHP-listed

Mississippi 
Harris-Banks House, Columbus, Mississippi, listed on the NRHP in Lowndes County, Mississippi

Missouri 
Col. John Harris House, Kansas City, Missouri, listed on the NRHP in Jackson County, Missouri
Capt. Thomas C. Harris House, Kirksville, Missouri, NRHP-listed
Harris-Chilton-Ruble House, New Franklin, Missouri, listed on the NRHP in Howard County, Missouri
 Harris House (Sedalia, Missouri), listed on the NRHP in Pettis County, Missouri

Montana 
 Harris House (Bozeman, Montana), listed on the NRHP in Gallatin County, Montana

Nebraska 
 Harris House (Lincoln, Nebraska), listed on the NRHP in Lancaster County, Nebraska

New Jersey 
Van Der Veer-Harris House, Woods Tavern, New Jersey, listed on the NRHP in Somerset County, New Jersey

North Carolina 
Spencer Harris House, Falkland, North Carolina, listed on the NRHP in Pitt County, North Carolina
Dr. J. H. Harris House, Franklinton, North Carolina, listed on the NRHP in Franklin County, North Carolina
Cabe-Pratt-Harris House, Hillsborough, North Carolina, listed on the NRHP in Orange County, North Carolina
Marshall-Harris-Richardson House, Raleigh, North Carolina, listed on the NRHP in Wake County, North Carolina
Harris-Currin House, Wilton, North Carolina, listed on the NRHP in Granville County, North Carolina

Ohio 
Stephen R. Harris House, Bucyrus, Ohio, listed on the NRHP in Crawford County, Ohio
Franklin Harris Farmstead, Salem, Ohio, NRHP-listed
William B. Harris House, Zanesville, Ohio, NRHP-listed

Oklahoma 
 Harris House (Haworth, Oklahoma), listed on the NRHP in McCurtain County, Oklahoma

Pennsylvania 
John Harris Mansion, Harrisburg, Pennsylvania, NRHP-listed

Rhode Island 
Elliot-Harris-Miner House, Lincoln, Rhode Island, NRHP-listed

South Dakota 
Fred S. Harris House, Belle Fourche, South Dakota, listed on the NRHP in Butte County, South Dakota

Tennessee 
V.R. Harris House, Erin, Tennessee, listed on the NRHP in Tennessee
Harris-Holden House, Howell, Tennessee, listed on the NRHP in Lincoln County, Tennessee
Capt. Harris House, Memphis, Tennessee, listed on the NRHP in Shelby County, Tennessee
Robert C. Harris House, South Berlin, Tennessee, listed on the NRHP in Marshall County, Tennessee

Texas 
Capt. Andrew Jackson Harris House, Belton, Texas, listed on the NRHP in Bell County, Texas
E. M. Harris House, Georgetown, Texas, listed on the NRHP in Williamson County, Texas
Beverly-Harris House, McKinney, Texas, listed on the NRHP in Collin County, Texas
Ethel Wilson Harris House, San Antonio, Texas, NRHP-listed
Goforth-Harris House, San Marcos, Texas, listed on the NRHP in Hays County, Texas

Utah 
Louis W. Harris House, Beaver, Utah, listed on the NRHP in Beaver County, Utah
Sarah Eliza Harris House, Beaver, Utah, NRHP-listed
Thomas and Caroline Harris House, Centerville, Utah, listed on the NRHP in Davis County, Utah
Harris-Tingey House, Centerville, Utah, listed on the NRHP in Davis County, Utah
Martin Harris Gravesite, Clarkston, Utah, NRHP-listed
Joseph D. Harris House, Park City, Utah, listed on the NRHP in Summit County, Utah
William H. Harris House, Park City, Utah, listed on the NRHP in Summit County, Utah

Vermont 
William Harris House, Brattleboro, Vermont, NRHP-listed in Windham County

Virginia 
Harris-Poindexter House and Store, Mineral, Virginia, NRHP-listed

Wisconsin 
 Harris House (Barneveld, Wisconsin), NRHP-listed in Iowa County
Abner L. Harris House, Reedsburg, Wisconsin, NRHP-listed in Sauk County

See also
 William Harris House (disambiguation)
 Harris Building (disambiguation)
 Harry's House (disambiguation)
 Smith-Harris House (disambiguation)